Pequea Township (pronounced peck-way) is a township in central Lancaster County, Pennsylvania, United States. The population was 5,493 at the 2020 census. The community was named for the Piqua tribe.

Geography
Pequea Creek, a southwest-flowing tributary of the Susquehanna River, forms the southern border of the township. Unincorporated communities in Pequea Township include New Danville, West Willow, Baumgardner, Burnt Mills, Herrville, and part of Willow Street.

Demographics

At the 2000 census there were 4,358 people, 1,581 households, and 1,263 families living in the township.  The population density was 320.3 people per square mile (123.6/km).  There were 1,626 housing units at an average density of 119.5/sq mi (46.1/km).  The racial makeup of the township was 97.71% White, 0.48% African American, 0.05% Native American, 0.62% Asian, 0.05% Pacific Islander, 0.30% from other races, and 0.80% from two or more races. Hispanic or Latino of any race were 1.03%.

There were 1,581 households, 33.6% had children under the age of 18 living with them, 71.5% were married couples living together, 5.5% had a female householder with no husband present, and 20.1% were non-families. 16.2% of households were made up of individuals, and 6.3% were one person aged 65 or older.  The average household size was 2.75 and the average family size was 3.09.

The age distribution was 26.7% under the age of 18, 6.6% from 18 to 24, 27.1% from 25 to 44, 27.3% from 45 to 64, and 12.4% 65 or older.  The median age was 39 years. For every 100 females, there were 100.2 males.  For every 100 females age 18 and over, there were 100.1 males.

The median household income was $52,969 and the median family income  was $59,010. Males had a median income of $39,423 versus $25,579 for females. The per capita income for the township was $22,323.  About 3.0% of families and 3.7% of the population were below the poverty line, including 6.2% of those under age 18 and 3.5% of those age 65 or over.

References

External links

Populated places established in 1853
Townships in Lancaster County, Pennsylvania
Townships in Pennsylvania